The Prelude and Fugue in D minor, BWV 875 is a keyboard composition written by Johann Sebastian Bach. It is the sixth prelude and fugue in the second book of The Well-Tempered Clavier, a series of 48 preludes and fugues by the composer.

Prelude
It is made up of running sixteenth notes and eighth notes.

Fugue
The fugue has 27 measures and is in common time. It is in three voices and has triplets, sixteenth notes, eighth notes, and many accidentals.

References

The Well-Tempered Clavier
Compositions in D minor